(born September 19, 1992) is a Japanese actress. She starred in Hanochi and is best known for her role as the young Nico Robin in the anime One Piece. She also voiced Daisy, in the sixth One Piece film, "Baron Omatsuri and the Secret Island". Nagai is represented by Topcoat.

External links
 Anzu Nagai website

References

21st-century Japanese actresses
1992 births
Living people